A Predator's Portrait is the third studio album by Swedish melodic death metal band Soilwork. It was released on 19 February 2001, and was reissued on 15 October 2013 in the U.S. and 18 October 2013 in Europe. This is the last album to feature Carlos Del Olmo Holmberg on keyboards. According to Nielsen Soundscan, the album sold 6.326 copies in the US as of 2002.

This is the first album where Björn "Speed" Strid started utilizing clean vocals mixed with his traditional screaming style and the first Soilwork release to be on Nuclear Blast. The album was recorded at the same studio and at the same time that Opeth recorded their album Blackwater Park.

"Shadowchild" is a rerecording from their reissue of The Chainheart Machine.

Track listing

Personnel

Soilwork
 Björn "Speed" Strid − vocals
 Peter Wichers − lead guitar
 Ola Frenning − rhythm guitar
 Henry Ranta − drums
 Ola Flink − bass guitar
 Carlos Del Olmo Holmberg − keyboards, artwork

Guests
 Mattias Eklundh − guitar solo on "Needlefeast"
Jens Broman (ex-Darkane) – co-writer
 Eskil Simonsson − samples on "Grand Failure Anthem"
 Mikael Åkerfeldt − co-vocals on "A Predator's Portrait"

Additional Personnel on the Deluxe Edition Bonus Tracks
Sven Karlsson – keyboards 
Dirk Verbeuren – drums 
Sylvain Coudret – guitar 
David Andersson – guitar

Production
 Mixed at Studio Fredman
 Drums recorded in DHS-Studios
 Mastered at The Mastering Room

References

External links
 A Predator's Portrait on Soilwork's official website

Soilwork albums
2001 albums
Nuclear Blast albums
Albums recorded at Studio Fredman
Albums produced by Fredrik Nordström